The Smith River flows from the Klamath Mountains to the Pacific Ocean in Del Norte County in extreme northwestern California, on the West Coast of the United States. The river, about 25.1 miles (40.4 km) long, all within Del Norte County, flows through the Rogue River – Siskiyou National Forest, Six Rivers National Forest, and Jedediah Smith Redwoods State Park.

Course
The Smith River is formed by the confluence of its Middle Fork and North Fork, near the community of Gasquet. The South Fork Smith River enters the Smith River near the community of Hiouchi.

Smith River estuary is recognized for protection by the California Bays and Estuaries Policy.

Watershed
It drains a rugged area of the western Klamath Mountains and Northern Outer California Coast Ranges, west of the Siskiyou Mountains, just south of the Oregon border, and north of the watershed of the Klamath River.

By average discharge, the Smith is the largest river system in California that flows freely along its entire course.

The river was named for the explorer Jedediah Smith.

Conservation
The free-flowing nature of the river—without a single dam along its entire length—makes it especially prized among conservationists and is considered one of the crown jewels of the National Wild and Scenic River program.

Crossings
The 1929 Smith River Bridge, also known as the Hiouchi Bridge or Bridge Wo. 1-06, was a rare example of a cantilever highway truss bridge within California, until it was demolished in 1989. The two-lane road bridge carried California State Highway 199 across the Smith River. The structural steel components were fabricated by Virginia Bridge & Iron Co. in Roanoke, shipped via the Panama Canal to San Francisco, then reloaded to a smaller coastal vessel and shipped to Crescent City. The suspended center span was a Parker truss.

It was the first cantilever truss type designed by the California Division of Highways Bridge Department engineers in 1928. The bridge type was briefly popular during the late 1920s to the late 1930s in the United States, but because it was best suited to specialized applications only limited numbers were built in the state. Its design was influenced by the first Carquinez Bridge, designed by David B. Steinman and completed in 1927 (demolished 2007).

Studies for the replacement of the Smith River Bridge began in 1987. State Highway 199 provides a link between Highway 101 at Crescent City on the northern California coast, and Interstate Highway 5 inland at Grants Pass, Oregon. The proposal to replace the bridge was based on its functionally obsolete structural condition. Because of the high percentage of heavy truck traffic using the route, the bridge had sustained damage from high loads over the years, causing concern that the bridge was susceptible to collapsing.

Since it had been determined eligible for inclusion on the National Register of Historic Places, it was required to be documented to Historic American Engineering Record−HAER standards prior to its removal in 1989.

References

External links

 Smithriveralliance.org: Smith River Alliance website
 
 KalmiopsisWild.org: North Fork Smith River
 

Rivers of Del Norte County, California
Wild and Scenic Rivers of the United States
Klamath Mountains
Redwood National and State Parks
Rogue River-Siskiyou National Forest
Six Rivers National Forest
Tourist attractions in Del Norte County, California
Rivers of Northern California